MacCabe may refer to:

MacCabe (surname), origin of the names MacCabe / McCabe and a list of people with the surnames.
MacCabe Park, a small park located in the City of Wollongong, Australia. 
MV Empire MacCabe, an oil tanker converted to a merchant aircraft carrier.